Locquignol is a commune in the Nord department in northern France.

Heraldry

Points of interest
Arboretum de l'Étang David

See also
Communes of the Nord department

References

Communes of Nord (French department)